Cosette is a feminine given name, is pronounced koh-ZETT. It is of French origin, is best known as the heroine of "Les Misérables" (1862) by Victor Hugo, Cosette was the nickname given to the girl named Euphrasie by her mother.

Meaning 
Cosette in modern name dictionaries give the meaning as "victorious," but it doesn't appear to have been in use as a first name until after Hugo published Les Miserables, although "Cozette" sometimes appeared as a surname. Victor Hugo said he created Cosette from "chosette", meaning "little thing" in French.

Popularity

The name Cosette is of French origin, and is used mostly in English speaking countries, as the novel of "Misérables" the name also got international position in other countries and languages of the world.

Despite the popularity of Les Misérables, the name was given to only seventy-five girls in 2011.

External links 
Cosette (Character) at the Internet Movie Database
Search for Cosette at the Internet Broadway Database

Notes

Feminine given names